Rudy Sylvan (born December 23, 1984) is a former American football tight end. He was originally signed by the Detroit Lions as an undrafted free agent in 2007. He played college football at Ohio.

College career
In 2004, Sylvan played in all 11 games for the Ohio Bobcats and turned his first catch into a 25-yard touchdown in the season opener against VMI. His second catch produced similar results, an eight-yard touchdown pass versus Buffalo. He kept the streak alive with a 17-yard touchdown catch against Marshall on his third reception of the season. His string was broken, however, when he caught a pass for 11 yards versus Bowling Green that did not result in points. In his senior season, Sylvan played in all 11 games. He finished second among Ohio tight ends with five catches for 24 yards and had career highs in catches with two during three occasions.  Also during his senior season, Sylvan helped lead the Bobcats to a MAC East Division title, a MAC Championship Game appearance, and a 2007 GMAC Bowl appearance. However, Sylvan was academically ineligible for the GMAC bowl game and was forced to sit out.

Junior college career
Sylvan attended Solano College in Fairfield, California.  While there, he had 18 catches for 350 yards as a freshman prior to transferring to Ohio.

High school career
Sylvan attended Armijo and Vanden High Schools, earning all-conference, all-county and all-city honors on the defensive line during his senior season. He led Vanden his senior year with 115 total tackles, adding 1.5 sacks and an interception. Sylvan was voted a share of the team's Most Valuable Defensive Player Award and helped the Vikings to a 9-3 record and their ninth straight playoff appearance as a senior.

External links
Detroit team roster
Sylvan signs with the Lions

1984 births
American football tight ends
Detroit Lions players
Living people
Ohio Bobcats football players
Ohio University alumni